Dorothy LaBostrie (May 28, 1928 – November 4, 2007), later Dorothy LaBostrie Black, was an American songwriter, best known for co-writing Little Richard's 1955 hit "Tutti Frutti".

Early life and songwriting career
She was born in Rayland, Kentucky; some sources incorrectly claim a birth year of 1938 rather than 1928.  Her parents were Amos and Orelia C. LaBostrie. She was raised in Mobile, Alabama, and in 1951 moved to New Orleans, Louisiana, to seek out her father's Creole relatives.  She started working as a cook and waitress, wrote poems, and began frequenting the jazz and blues clubs on Rampart Street.

In September 1955 — though details of the story vary — she was contacted by record producer Bumps Blackwell of Specialty Records, who needed someone to rewrite and tone down the lyrics of a ribald song performed by Little Richard.  LaBostrie went to Cosimo Matassa's studio, where Little Richard was recording, and reportedly rewrote the words of the song in 15 minutes. "Tutti Frutti" is regarded as one of the defining songs of rock and roll, and has been recorded by many later artists.

She was credited as co-writer of the song, with Little Richard (Penniman), but later claimed that she had written it in its entirety. She later laughed at Little Richard's claim that he had written the song by himself and was cheated out of royalties for years, saying "Little Richard didn't write none of 'Tutti Frutti'." She was still receiving royalty checks for the song, at an average of $5,000 every three to six months, in the 1980s.

Also in 1955, she contributed another song to Specialty, "Rich Woman", co-written and performed by McKinley "Li'l" Millet.  Although not successful at the time, it was later recorded by Canned Heat among others, and most notably by Robert Plant and Alison Krauss, whose recording of it won the 2009 Grammy Award for Best Pop Collaboration with Vocals.

She later worked as a songwriter for Joe Ruffino, owner of the local record labels Ric and Ron.  She wrote the song "I Won't Cry" in 1958, and persuaded Ruffino to allow her neighbor, Johnny Adams, to record it.  The record, produced by teenager Mac Rebennack (Dr. John), was a local hit and started Adams' successful career.  She also wrote Irma Thomas' first record, "(You Can Have My Husband But Please) Don't Mess With My Man", which reached the national R&B chart in 1960.  Her working relationship with Ruffino later deteriorated over royalty payments.  She signed a songwriting contract with Matassa's White Cliffs publishing company, reportedly writing hundreds of songs over the following years, but none had the commercial success of her earlier songs.

Later life and death
At some point, she married Clyde Black and had two daughters. In 1970, after being injured in a road accident, she moved to New York and broke her ties with the music business.  In the 1980s, she was reported to be living a quiet life, receiving regular royalty payments from the continued popularity of "Tutti Frutti".

Dorothy LaBostrie Black died while visiting friends in Atlanta, Georgia on 4 November 2007, aged 79.

References

External links
  Transcript of interview with Dorothy LaBostrie,  1995

African-American songwriters
American rock songwriters
Songwriters from Kentucky
1928 births
2007 deaths
American women songwriters
20th-century American musicians
20th-century American women musicians
African-American women musicians
20th-century African-American women
20th-century African-American musicians
21st-century African-American people
21st-century African-American women